Gaël Monfils was the defending champion, but lost to Richard Gasquet in the semifinals.
Gasquet went on to win the title, defeating Jerzy Janowicz in the final, 3–0, ret.

Seeds
The first four seeds received a bye into the second round.

 Gaël Monfils (semifinals)
 Gilles Simon (quarterfinals)
 Philipp Kohlschreiber (quarterfinals)
 Richard Gasquet (champion)
 Jerzy Janowicz (final, retired due to illness)
 Denis Istomin (quarterfinals)
 João Sousa (semifinals)
 Jan-Lennard Struff (first round)

Draw

Finals

Top half

Bottom half

Qualifying

Seeds

 Steve Darcis (qualified)
 Alexander Zverev (qualifying competition)
 Nikoloz Basilashvili (qualified)
 Taro Daniel (qualified)
 Jürgen Zopp (qualified)
 Enzo Couacaud (qualifying competition)
 Thomas Fabbiano (qualifying competition)
 Mathias Bourgue (first round)

Qualifiers

Qualifying draw

First qualifier

Second qualifier

Third qualifier

Fourth qualifier

References
 Main Draw
 Qualifying Draw

O
Singles